RC Cars, also known as Smash Cars for the PlayStation 2 and PlayStation 3 versions, is a vehicular combat game developed by Creat Games for Microsoft Windows and PlayStation 2 in 2002-2003.

Reception

The game received "mixed or average reviews" on all platforms according to the review aggregation website Metacritic. Many reviewers gave the PlayStation 2 version mixed or unfavorable reviews, months before it was released Stateside. In Japan, where the PS2 version was ported and published by Psikyo under the name  on November 20, 2003, Famitsu gave it a score of 25 out of 40.

References

External links
 
 

2002 video games
PlayStation 2 games
PlayStation 3 games
PlayStation Network games
Vehicular combat games
Video games about toys
Video games developed in the United States
Windows games
Psikyo games
Multiplayer and single-player video games
1C Company games
Metro3D games
TikGames games